The Harrisburg Symphony Orchestra (HSO) is an American orchestra based in Harrisburg, Pennsylvania, US.

The Harrisburg Symphony Orchestra can be traced back to the early 1930s during the throes of the Great Depression. The orchestra gave its first concert at William Penn High School in Harrisburg on March 19, 1931. The conductor on that occasion was Maestro George King Raudenbush, who was to become the orchestra's first music director. By the end of 1931 the orchestra had moved its concerts to the newly opened Forum Auditorium, part of the Capitol Complex, where it still performs to this day. The 1931–32 season included four concerts. The cost of a subscription: $2.00.

The orchestra membership consists of professional players from Central Pennsylvania, Philadelphia, Baltimore, Washington, DC, New York, and other regions. Being able to select from such a wide variety of talent pools enables the HSO to perform at a particularly high artistic level. The HSO membership is represented by American Federation of Musicians (AFM) Local 269, and the group is a member of ROPA, the Regional Orchestra Players' Association.

Music directors
1931-1950: George King Raudenbush
1950-1974: Edwin McArthur
1974-1978: David Epstein
1978-1994: Larry Newland
1995-1999: Richard Westerfield
2000–Present: Stuart Malina

Youth Symphony Orchestra
The Harrisburg Youth Symphony Orchestra, founded in 1953 and one of the oldest youth symphonies in the country. The Youth Symphony operates under the umbrella of the Harrisburg Symphony. The current conductor of the Youth Symphony is Gregory Woodbridge.

References
Mission and History of Harrisburg Symphony Orchestra

External links
HSO official site

Organizations based in Harrisburg, Pennsylvania
Culture of Harrisburg, Pennsylvania
Performing arts in Harrisburg, Pennsylvania
Musical groups established in 1931
Orchestras based in Pennsylvania